Pochinki is a rural locality (a village) in Fominskoye Rural Settlement, Gorokhovetsky District, Vladimir Oblast, Russia. The population was 13 as of 2010.

Geography 
The village is located 5 km north-east from Fominki, 38 km south-west from Gorokhovets.

References 

Rural localities in Gorokhovetsky District